Křinec is a market town in Nymburk District in the Central Bohemian Region of the Czech Republic. It has about 1,300 inhabitants.

Administrative parts
Villages of Bošín, Mečíř, Nové Zámky, Sovenice and Zábrdovice are administrative parts of Křinec.

Geography
It lies in a flat landscape in the Central Elbe Table. The market town is situated on the right bank of the Mrlina River.

History
The first written mention of Křinec is from 1352. After the Hussite Wars, the village was acquired by a noble family, since then known as the Křinecký of Ronov family. They had built the Kuncberk Castle on the eponymous hill above the village. They sold the Kuncberk estate to the Kostomlatský of Vřesovice family in 1565. Křinec was first referred to as a market town in 1568.

After the Battle of White Mountain, Křinec was acquired by Albrecht von Wallenstein, who soon gave it to another members of the Waldstein family. In 1649, Křinec was purchased by the Morzin family. They had completely rebuilt the market town, badly damaged during the Thirty Years' War. They owned Křinec until 1796.

Sights
The Křinec Castle is an early Baroque castle, one of the two landmarks of Křinice. The main building was built in 1649 and the wings in 1659–1660. The castle was probably designed by Carlo Lurago. A park is adjacent to the castle. Today it serves cultural and social purposes, and offers sightseeing tours.

Opposite the castle stands the Church of Saint Giles. It is a Baroque church from the 17th century.

Kuncberk Castle has not survived. After the castle disappeared, a baroque manor house was built in its place, but it too has not been preserved and only the cellars are visible in its place.

References

External links

Market towns in the Czech Republic